The 20th Chess Olympiad (20. Šahovska olimpijada), organized by FIDE and comprising an open team tournament, as well as several other events designed to promote the game of chess, took place between September 18 and October 13, 1972, in Skopje, Yugoslavia (present-day Macedonia).

Summary
For the first time, the Soviet team only comprised 5 GMs and one IM (Savon). Since Bobby Fischer had beaten Spassky earlier in the year, the team wasn't led by the current world champion – also a first. It did, however, feature three previous (Smyslov, Tal, and Petrosian) as well as one future champion (Karpov). The team still lived up to expectations, though, and won their eleventh consecutive gold medal, with Hungary and Yugoslavia taking the silver and bronze, respectively.

Before the Soviet team could achieve a victory, there was some controversy. In the 4th round of Final Group A, the Soviets played a match against the team from Bulgaria. A game between Victor Korchnoi and Georgi Tringov was adjourned after 41 moves with Tringov to seal his next move. At this Olympiad, sealed moves were written on a separate piece of paper, not the player's score sheet. Tringov rejected this way of sealing his move and instead wrote it on his score sheet. When the game was resumed, the arbiter opened the envelope. In the envelope was Korchnoi's score sheet but not the one belonging to Tringov. The arbiter ruled the game a forfeit win for Korchnoi. The Bulgarian team captain instituted protest proceedings but an arbitration committee upheld the arbiter's ruling. After the Olympiad was over, it was learned that Tringov had absentmindedly placed his score sheet in his pocket. Tringov discovered his mistake several days after his forfeit but was too ashamed to admit his mistake to the organizers of the Olympiad.

In Final B, the Albanian team refused to play Israel and withdrew after round 11. Their matches were regarded as "friendlies" and didn't count in the overall standings.

Jens Enevoldsen represented Denmark at his 11th and final Olympiad, 39 years after his first appearance at Folkestone 1933. Both records at the time (although both have since been beaten by Lajos Portisch).

The 5th Women's Chess Olympiad also took place; this was the first time that it took place at the same time and in the same venue as the open event. It was won by the Soviet Union team.

Open event

Preliminaries
A total of 63 teams were divided into eight preliminary groups of seven or eight teams each, from which the top two advanced to Final A, no. 3-4 to Final B etc. Unlike the last few tournaments, preliminary head-to-head results were not carried over to the finals, so each teams met one other team twice. All preliminary groups and finals were played as round-robin tournaments. The results were as follows:

 Group 1: 

 Group 2: 

 Group 3: 

 Group 4: 

 Group 5: 

 Group 6: 

 Group 7: 

 Group 8:

Finals
{| class="wikitable"
|+ Final A
! # !! Country !! Players !! Averagerating !! Points !! MP !! Head-to-head
|-
| style="background:gold;"|1 ||  || Petrosian, Korchnoi, Smyslov, Tal, Karpov, Savon || 2635 || 42 ||  || 
|-
| style="background:silver;"|2 ||  || Portisch, Bilek, Forintos, Ribli, Csom, Sax || 2531 || 40½ ||  || 
|-
| style="background:#cc9966;"|3 ||  || Gligorić, Ivkov, Ljubojević, Matanović, Matulović, Rukavina || 2543 || 38 ||  || 
|-
| 4 ||  || Hort, Smejkal, Filip, Jansa, Přibyl, Trapl || 2534 || 35½ ||  || 
|-
| 5 ||  || Hübner, Darga, Pfleger, Hecht, Kestler, Dueball || 2540 || 35 ||  || 
|-
| 6 ||  || Bobotsov, Tringov, Radulov, Padevsky, Peev, Bohosjan || 2459 || 32 ||  || 
|-
| 7 ||  || Gheorghiu, Ciocâltea, Ghițescu, Ungureanu, Ghizdavu, Partoș || 2466 || 31½ ||  || 
|-
| 8 ||  || Donner, Ree, Zuidema, Timman, Hartoch, Enklaar || 2465 || 29 || 13 || 2½
|-
| 9 ||  || Kavalek, Byrne, Benko, Bisguier, Martz, Kane || 2515 || 29 || 13 || 1½
|-
| 10 ||  || Uhlmann, Malich, Knaak, Liebert, Schöneberg, Vogt || 2490 || 27½ ||  || 
|-
| 11 ||  || Pomar, Díez del Corral, Medina, Torán, Bellón López, Visier Segovia || 2434 || 26 ||  || 
|-
| 12 ||  || Schmidt, Bednarski, Pytel, Sznapik, Filipowicz, Sydor || 2410 || 24½ ||  || 
|-
| 13 ||  || Hamann, Jakobsen, Sloth, Holm, Enevoldsen, Pedersen || 2428 || 23 ||  || 
|-
| 14 ||  || Rossetto, García, Rubinetti, Emma, Debarnot, Hase || 2418 || 22½ || 9 || 
|-
| 15 ||  || Andersson, Jansson, Ornstein, Liljedahl, Olsson, Uddenfeldt || 2399 || 22½ || 8 || 
|-
| 16 ||  || Hug, Lombard, Bhend, Schaufelberger, Wirthensohn, Gereben || 2383 || 21½ ||  || 
|}

{| class="wikitable"
|+ Final B
! # !!Country !! Players !! Averagerating !! Points !! MP
|-
| 17 ||  || Keene, Hartston, Wade, Markland, Whiteley, Littlewood || 2413 || 37 || 
|-
| 18 ||  || Kagan, Kraidman, Geller, Kaldor, Balshan, Friedman  || 2353 || 36½ || 
|-
| 19 ||  || Suttles, Yanofsky, Vranesic, Biyiasas, Amos, Day  || 2443 || 33 || 
|-
| 20 ||  || Torre, Cardoso, Rodríguez, De Castro, Badilles, Lobigas  || 2365 || 31½ || 
|-
| 21 ||  || Kristiansen, Wibe, Johannessen, Hoen, Øgaard, Zwaig  || 2404 || 30½ || 
|-
| 22 ||  || Rodríguez Cordoba, García Martínez, Cobo Arteaga, Hernández, Estévez Morales, Carlos Diaz  || 2383 || 30 || 16
|-
| 23 ||  || Robatsch, Röhrl, Janetschek, Watzka, Strobel, Holaszek  || 2360 || 30 || 15
|-
| 24 ||  || Sigurjónsson, Kristinsson, Torsteinsson, Sólmundarson, Torvaldsson, Magnússon  || 2419 || 29 || 
|-
| 25 ||  || Cuéllar, Gutierrez, Cuartas, de Greiff, Minaya Molano, Castro  || 2361 || 27 || 
|-
| 26 ||  || Wotulo, Ardiansyah, Bachtiar, Sampouw, Suradiradja, Turalakey  || 2318 || 25½ || 
|-
| 27 ||  || Tatai, Mariotti, Paoli, Micheli, Cappello, Capece  || 2358 || 25 || 
|-
| 28 ||  || Üitümen, Myagmarsuren, Tumurbator, Jigjidsuren, Niamdorzi, Zorigt  || 2330 || 24½ || 
|-
| 29 ||  || Siaperas, Vizantiadis, Skalkotas, Trikaliotis, Makropoulos, Balaskas  || 2273 || 21 || 
|-
| 30 ||  || Boey, Van Seters, Cornelis, Beyen, Verstraeten, Wostyn  || 2298 || 20½ || 
|-
| 31 ||  || Rodríguez Vargas, Quiñones, Vásquez, Pesantes Carbajal, Villasante, García Toledo  || 2303 || 19 || 
|-
| - ||  || Pustina, Vila, Adhami, Muço, Omari, Zadrima  || 2245 || - || 
|}

{| class="wikitable"
|+ Final C
! # !! Country !! Players !! Averagerating !! Points !! MP !! Head-to-head
|-
| 32 ||  || Browne, Fuller, Hay, Flatow, Hamilton, Shaw  || 2370 || 45 ||  || 
|-
| 33 ||  || Westerinen, Ojanen, Saren, Sorri, Rantanen, Kanko  || 2288 || 42½ ||  || 
|-
| 34 ||  || Levy, Pritchett, Bonner, Jamieson, Denman, Aitken  || 2273 || 39 ||  || 
|-
| 35 ||  || Harandi, Shirazi, Shahsavar, Sharif, Sawadkuhi, Saloor  || 2250 || 37½ ||  || 
|-
| 36 ||  || German, Trois, Nóbrega, Toth, van Riemsdijk, dos Santos  || 2236 || 25½ ||  || 
|-
| 37 ||  || Ribeiro, Durão, Silva, Santos, Cardoso, Figueiredo  || 2285 || 32½ ||  || 
|-
| 38 ||  || Süer, Külür, Onat, Erözbek, Uzman, Bilyap  || 2261 || 31 ||  || 
|-
| 39 ||  || Moles, MacGrillen, Littleton, Cassidy, Coldrick, Keeshan M.  || 2200 || 28½ || 15 || 
|-
| 40 ||  || Kaplan, Martínez Buitrago, Berríos Pagán, Benítez, Sacarello, Colón Romero M.  || 2280 || 28½ || 12 || 
|-
| 41 ||  || Campos López, Frey, Escondrillas, De la Cruz, Padilla, Barrientos  || 2213 || 26½ || 12 || 3
|-
| 42 ||  || Belkadi, Kchouk, Drira, Teboudi K., Najar C., Lagha  || 2225 || 26½ || 12 || 1
|-
| 43 ||  || Williams, Hutchings, Gavrilovic, Jones, Haigh, James  || 2248 || 26½ || 10 || 
|-
| 44 ||  || Sarapu, Sutton, Stuart, Carpinter, Van Dijk, Kerr  || 2235 || 25 ||  || 
|-
| 45 ||  || Belliard Alonzo, Delgado, Gonzáles, Peña, Malagón, Álvarez  || 2200 || 21½ ||  || 
|-
| 46 ||  || Martínez Vaca, Chávez Chávez, Alvarez U., Carvajal, Mendivil  || 2200 || 19 ||  || 
|-
| 47 ||  || Miyasaki, Matsumoto, Gonda, Takahashi, Otami K., Nakamori  || 2220 || 15½ ||  || 
|}

{| class="wikitable"
|+ Final D
! # !! Country !! Players !! Rating !! Points !! MP
|-
| 48 ||  || Rossolimo, Todorcevic, Letzelter, Huguet, Raizman, Haïk  || 2276 || 46½ || 
|-
| 49 ||  || Tan Lian Ann, Lim Kok Ann, Giam Choo Kwee, Choong Liong On, Ee, Pang Kwok Leong  || 2263 || 42½ || 
|-
| 50 ||  || Camilleri, Gouder, Attard, Saliba, Cilia Vincenti, Casha  || 2213 || 32½ || 
|-
| 51 ||  || Krstic, Hasan, Kwan Nam Seng, Hobson, Kong V., Krouk  || 2200 || 30½ || 
|-
| 52 ||  || Sursock, Loheac-Ammoun, Maalouf, Bedrossian, Galeb  || 2200 || 30 || 
|-
| 53 ||  || Philippe, Weber, Stull, Schammo, Simon, Kirsch  || 2214 || 29½ || 
|-
| 54 ||  || Petersen, Joensen, Midjord, Mikkelsen, Thomsen, Olsen  || 2200 || 29 || 
|-
| 55 ||  || Shorbagay, Catalan, Nashed, Asfary, Sayed M., Tabba   || 2200 || 28 || 
|-
| 56 ||   || Kleopas, Constantinou, Avgousti, Martidis, Vassiades, Hadjittofis   || 2200 || 27½ || 
|-
| 57 ||  || Belarbi, Kaderi, Abbou, Chami, Sbia, Abdelmalek  || 2205 || 26 || 
|-
| 58 ||  || Ballague, Calderon D., De la Casa, Gómez Abad, Pantebre Martínez, Iglesias  || 2200 || 24 || 
|-
| 59 ||  || Foo Lum Choon, Chan Mun Fye, Kao Yin Keat, Fang Ewe Churh, Loh Chee Hoong, Ariff A.  || 2200 || 23½ || 
|-
| 60 ||  || Palmer, Marquand, Bisson, Moriarty, Wallbridge, Gavey  || 2200 || 20½ || 9
|-
| 61 ||  || Taha, Al-Hamani, Al-Jassani, Ahmed K., Al-Mawla, Salim  || 2200 || 20½ || 5
|-
| 62 ||  || Abraham, Grumer E., Potter H., Edwards, Grumer S.  || 2200 || 10½ || 
|}

Final A 
{| class="wikitable"
|-
! Place
! Country
! 1 !!2 !!3 !!4 !!5 !!6 !!7 !!8 !!9 !!10 !!11 !!12 !!13 !!14 !!15 !!16
! !!+ !!- !!= !!Points
|- 
! 1
| align=left bgcolor="gold"|
| -  || style="color: blue;" |1½ ||style="color: red;"|2½ ||style="color: green;"|2 ||style="color: red;"|2½ ||style="color: red;"|2½ ||style="color: red;"|3 ||style="color: red;"|2½ ||style="color: red;"|3 ||style="color: red;"|3½ ||style="color: red;"|3½ ||style="color: red;"|3 ||style="color: red;"|3½ ||style="color: green;"|2 ||style="color: red;"|3 ||style="color: red;"|4
! 
|12 ||1 ||2 ||align=center|42
|-
! 2
| align=left bgcolor="silver"| 
|style="color: red"|2½ || -  || style="color: red" |2½ ||style="color: red"|2½ ||style="color: green"|2 ||style="color: red"|2½ ||style="color: red"|2½ ||style="color: red"|2½ ||style="color: red"|2½ ||style="color: red"|3½ ||style="color: red"|3½ ||style="color: red"|3 ||style="color: green"|2 ||style="color: red"|4 ||style="color: blue"|1½ ||style="color: red;"|3½
! 
|12 ||1 ||2 ||align=center|40½
|-
! 3
| align=left bgcolor="CC9966"| 
|style="color: blue"|1½ ||style="color: blue"|1½ || -  || style="color: blue" |1½ ||style="color: green"|2 ||style="color: green"|2 ||style="color: green"|2 ||style="color: red"|3 ||style="color: red"|3 ||style="color: red"|2½ ||style="color: red"|3 ||style="color: red"|3 ||style="color: red"|3½ ||style="color: red"|3 ||style="color: red"|2½ ||style="color: red;"|4
! 
|9 ||3 ||3 ||align=center|38
|-
! 4
| align=left|
|style="color: green;"|2 ||style="color: blue"|1½ ||style="color: red;"|2½ || -  || style="color: blue;" |1½ ||style="color: red"|2½ ||style="color: red;"|2½ ||style="color: red;"|2½ ||style="color: green"|2 ||style="color: blue;"|1½ ||style="color: blue;"|1½ ||style="color: red"|2½ ||style="color: red;"|3½ ||style="color: red;"|2½ ||style="color: red"|4 ||style="color: red;"|3
! 
|9 ||4 ||2 ||align=center|35½
|-
! 5
| align=left|
|style="color: blue;"|1½ ||style="color: green;"|2 ||style="color: green;"|2 ||style="color: red;"|2½ || -  || style="color: red;" |2½ ||style="color: red;"|2½ ||style="color: red;"|2½ ||style="color: red;"|2½ ||style="color: red;"|2½ ||style="color: red;"|2½ ||style="color: green;"|2 ||style="color: green;"|2 ||style="color: red;"|3 ||style="color: green;"|2 ||style="color: red;"|3
! 
|9 ||1 ||5 ||align=center|35
|-
! 6
| align=left|
|style="color: blue;"|1½ ||style="color: blue;"|1½ ||style="color: green;"|2 ||style="color: blue"|1½ ||style="color: blue;"|1½ || -  || style="color: red" |2½ ||style="color: red;"|3 ||style="color: red;"|2½ ||style="color: red;"|2½ ||style="color: green;"|2 ||style="color: red;"|2½  ||style="color: red;"|2½ ||style="color: green;"|2 ||style="color: red;"|2½ ||style="color: green;"|2
! 
|7 ||4 ||4 ||align=center|32
|-
! 7
| align=left|
|style="color: blue"|1 ||style="color: blue;"|1½ ||style="color: green;"|2 ||style="color: blue;"|1½ ||style="color: blue;"|1½ ||style="color: blue"|1½ || -  || style="color: green;" |2  ||style="color: green;"|2 ||style="color: red;"|3 ||style="color: red;"|2½ ||style="color: red;"|2½ ||style="color: red;"|2½ ||style="color: red;"|3½ ||style="color: green;"|2 ||style="color: red;"|2½
! 
|6 ||5 ||4 ||align=center|31½
|-
! 8
| align=left|
|style="color: blue;"|1½ ||style="color: blue;"|1½ ||style="color: blue;"|1 ||style="color: blue;"|1½ ||style="color: blue;"|1½ ||style="color: blue;"|1 ||style="color: green;"|2 || -  || style="color: red" |2½ ||style="color: red;"|3 ||style="color: red;"|3 ||style="color: green;"|2 ||style="color: red"|2½ ||style="color: blue;"|1½ ||style="color: green;"|2 ||style="color: red;"|2½
! 
|5 ||7 ||3 ||align=center|29
|-
! 9
| align=left|
|style="color: blue;"|1 ||style="color: blue;"|1½ ||style="color: blue;"|1 ||style="color: green"|2 ||style="color: blue;"|1½ ||style="color: blue;"|1½ ||style="color: green;"|2 ||style="color: blue"|1½ || -  || style="color: red;" |2½ ||style="color: red;"|3 ||style="color: red;"|3 ||style="color: blue;"|1½ ||style="color: red;"|2½ ||style="color: red"|2½ ||style="color: green;"|2
! 
|5 ||7 ||3 ||align=center|29
|-
! 10
| align=left|
|style="color: blue;"|½ ||style="color: blue"|½ ||style="color: blue"|1½ ||style="color: red;"|2½ ||style="color: blue;"|1½ ||style="color: blue;"|1½ ||style="color: blue;"|1 ||style="color: blue;"|1 ||style="color: blue;"|1½ || -  || style="color: red;" |2½ ||style="color: green;"|2 ||style="color: green"|2 ||style="color: red;"|3 ||style="color: red;"|4 ||style="color: red;"|2½
! 
|5 ||8 ||2 ||align=center|27½
|-
! 11
| align=left|
|style="color: blue;"|½ ||style="color: blue;"|½ ||style="color: blue;"|1 ||style="color: red;"|2½ ||style="color: blue;"|1½ ||style="color: green;"|2 ||style="color: blue;"|1½ ||style="color: blue;"|1 ||style="color: blue;"|1 ||style="color: blue;"|1½ || -  || style="color: green;" |2 ||style="color: red;"|3½ ||style="color: red;"|3 ||style="color: blue;"|1½ ||style="color: red;"|3
! 
|4 ||9 ||2 ||align=center|26
|-
! 12
| align=left|
|style="color: blue;"|1 ||style="color: blue;"|1 ||style="color: blue;"|1 ||style="color: blue"|1½ ||style="color: green;"|2 ||style="color: blue;"|1½ ||style="color: blue;"|1½ ||style="color: green;"|2 ||style="color: blue;"|1 ||style="color: green;"|2 ||style="color: green;"|2 || -  || style="color: green;" |2 ||style="color: green"|2 ||style="color: green;"|2 ||style="color: green;"|2
! 
|0 ||7 ||8 ||align=center|24½
|-
! 13
| align=left|
|style="color: blue;"|½ ||style="color: green;"|2 ||style="color: blue;"|½ ||style="color: blue;"|½ ||style="color: green;"|2 ||style="color: blue;"|1½ ||style="color: blue;"|1½ ||style="color: blue"|1½ ||style="color: red;"|2½ ||style="color: green"|2 ||style="color: blue;"|½ ||style="color: green;"|2 || -  || style="color: green;" |2 ||style="color: red;"|2½ ||style="color: blue;"|1½
! 
|2 ||8 ||5 ||align=center|23
|-
! 14
| align=left|
|style="color: green;"|2 ||style="color: blue;"|0 ||style="color: blue"|1 ||style="color: blue;"|1½ ||style="color: blue;"|1 ||style="color: green;"|2 ||style="color: blue;"|½ ||style="color: red;"|2½ ||style="color: blue;"|1½ ||style="color: blue;"|1 ||style="color: blue;"|1 ||style="color: green"|2 ||style="color: green;"|2 || -  || style="color: red;" |2½ ||style="color: green;"|2
! 
|2 ||8 ||5 ||align=center|22½
|-
! 15
| align=left|
|style="color: blue;"|1 ||style="color: red"|2½ ||style="color: blue;"|1½ ||style="color: blue"|0 ||style="color: green;"|2 ||style="color: blue;"|1½ ||style="color: green;"|2 ||style="color: green;"|2 ||style="color: blue"|1½ ||style="color: blue;"|0 ||style="color: red;"|2½ ||style="color: green;"|2 ||style="color: blue;"|1½ ||style="color: blue;"|1½ || -  ||style="color: blue;"|1
! 
|2 ||9 ||4 ||align=center|22½
|-
! 16
| align=left|
|style="color: blue;"|0 ||style="color: blue"|½ ||style="color: blue;"|0 ||style="color: blue"|1 ||style="color: blue;"|1 ||style="color: green;"|2 ||style="color: blue;"|1½ ||style="color: blue;"|1½ ||style="color: green"|2 ||style="color: blue;"|1½ ||style="color: blue;"|1 ||style="color: green;"|2 ||style="color: red;"|2½ ||style="color: green;"|2 ||style="color: red;"|3 || -
! 
|2 ||9 ||4 ||align=center|21½
|}

Final B 
{| class="wikitable"
|-
! Place
! Country
! 17 !!18 !!19 !!20 !!21 !!22 !!23 !!24 !!25 !!26 !!27 !!28 !!29 !!30 !!31 !!-
! !!+ !!- !!= !!Points
|- 
! 17
|
| -  || style="color: red;" |2½ ||style="color: green;"|2 ||style="color: red;"|2½ ||style="color: red;"|3 ||style="color: green;"|2 ||style="color: red;"|2½ ||style="color: red;"|3½ ||style="color: red;"|2½ ||style="color: red;"|3½ ||style="color: red;"|3 ||style="color: red;"|3 ||style="color: red;"|3 ||style="color: blue;"|1½ ||style="color: red;"|2½ || 2½
! 
|11 ||1 ||2 ||align=center|37
|-
! 18
|
|style="color: blue"|1½ || -  || style="color: red" |3 ||style="color: blue"|1½ ||style="color: red"|3½ ||style="color: green"|2 ||style="color: red"|2½ ||style="color: red"|3 ||style="color: green"|2 ||style="color: red"|3½ ||style="color: red"|2½ ||style="color: red"|3 ||style="color: red"|3½ ||style="color: red"|3 ||style="color: green"|2 || 4
! 
|9 ||2 ||3 ||align=center|36½
|-
! 19
| 
|style="color: green"|2 ||style="color: blue"|1 || -  || style="color: blue" |1 ||style="color: red"|2½ ||style="color: red"|2½ ||style="color: green"|2 ||style="color: red"|2½ ||style="color: green"|2 ||style="color: red"|3 ||style="color: red"|3 ||style="color: red"|2½ ||style="color: red"|2½ ||style="color: red"|4 ||style="color: red"|2½ || 1½
! 
|9 ||2 ||3 ||align=center|33
|-
! 20
| align=left|
|style="color: blue;"|1½ ||style="color: red"|2½ ||style="color: red;"|3 || -  || style="color: blue;" |1½ ||style="color: red"|2½ ||style="color: blue;"|½ ||style="color: green;"|2 ||style="color: red"|3½ ||style="color: red;"|2½ ||style="color: blue;"|1 ||style="color: green"|2 ||style="color: red;"|3 ||style="color: red;"|2½ ||style="color: red"|3½ ||
! 
|8 ||4 ||2 ||align=center|31½
|-
! 21
| align=left|
|style="color: blue;"|1 ||style="color: blue;"|½ ||style="color: blue;"|1½ ||style="color: red;"|2½ || -  || style="color: blue;" |1 ||style="color: blue;"|1½ ||style="color: red;"|3 ||style="color: red;"|3 ||style="color: green;"|2 ||style="color: green;"|2 ||style="color: red;"|3½ ||style="color: red;"|3 ||style="color: red;"|3 ||style="color: red;"|32 || 1
! 
|7 ||5 ||2 ||align=center|30½
|-
! 22
| align=left|
|style="color: green;"|2 ||style="color: green;"|2 ||style="color: blue;"|1½ ||style="color: blue"|1½ ||style="color: red;"|3 || -  || style="color: red" |3 ||style="color: blue;"|1½ ||style="color: red;"|2½ ||style="color: green;"|2 ||style="color: red;"|2½ ||style="color: green;"|2  ||style="color: green;"|2 ||style="color: green;"|2 ||style="color: red;"|2½ || 2½
! 
|5 ||3 ||6 ||align=center|30
|-
! 23
| align=left|
|style="color: blue"|1½ ||style="color: blue;"|1½ ||style="color: green;"|2 ||style="color: red;"|3½ ||style="color: red;"|2½ ||style="color: blue"|1 || -  || style="color: green;" |2  ||style="color: red;"|2½ ||style="color: red;"|2½ ||style="color: blue;"|1½ ||style="color: blue;"|1 ||style="color: red;"|3½ ||style="color: green;"|2 ||style="color: red;"|3 || 3
! 
|6 ||5 ||3 ||align=center|30
|-
! 24
| align=left|
|style="color: blue;"|½ ||style="color: blue;"|1 ||style="color: blue;"|1½ ||style="color: green;"|2 ||style="color: blue;"|1 ||style="color: red;"|2½ ||style="color: green;"|2 || -  || style="color: green" |2 ||style="color: red;"|3 ||style="color: red;"|2½ ||style="color: red;"|2½ ||style="color: green"|2 ||style="color: red;"|2½ ||style="color: red;"|4 || 3½
! 
|6 ||4 ||4 ||align=center|29
|-
! 25
| align=left|
|style="color: blue;"|1½ ||style="color: green;"|2 ||style="color: green;"|2 ||style="color: blue"|½ ||style="color: blue;"|1 ||style="color: blue;"|1½ ||style="color: blue;"|1½ ||style="color: green"|2 || -  || style="color: green;" |2 ||style="color: red;"|3 ||style="color: green;"|2 ||style="color: red;"|2½ ||style="color: red;"|2½ ||style="color: red"|3 || 2½
! 
|4 ||5 ||5 ||align=center|27
|-
! 26
| align=left|
|style="color: blue;"|½ ||style="color: blue"|½ ||style="color: blue"|1 ||style="color: blue;"|1½ ||style="color: green;"|2 ||style="color: green;"|2 ||style="color: blue;"|1½ ||style="color: blue;"|1 ||style="color: green;"|2 || -  || style="color: red;" |3½ ||style="color: blue;"|1½ ||style="color: red"|3 ||style="color: red;"|4 ||style="color: blue;"|1½ || 2
! 
|3 ||8 ||3 ||align=center|25½
|-
! 27
| align=left|
|style="color: blue;"|1 ||style="color: blue;"|1½ ||style="color: blue;"|1 ||style="color: red;"|3 ||style="color: green;"|2 ||style="color: blue;"|1½ ||style="color: red;"|2½ ||style="color: blue;"|1½ ||style="color: blue;"|1 ||style="color: blue;"|½ || -  || style="color: blue;" |1 ||style="color: red;"|2½ ||style="color: green;"|2 ||style="color: red;"|4 || 1½
! 
|4 ||8 ||2 ||align=center|25
|-
! 28
| align=left|
|style="color: blue;"|1 ||style="color: blue;"|1 ||style="color: blue;"|1½ ||style="color: green"|2 ||style="color: blue;"|½ ||style="color: green;"|2 ||style="color: red;"|3 ||style="color: blue;"|1½ ||style="color: green;"|2 ||style="color: red;"|2½ ||style="color: red;"|3 || -  || style="color: blue;" |1 ||style="color: red"|2½ ||style="color: blue;"|1 ||
! 
|4 ||7 ||3 ||align=center|24½
|-
! 29
| align=left|
|style="color: blue;"|1 ||style="color: blue;"|½ ||style="color: blue;"|1½ ||style="color: blue;"|1 ||style="color: blue;"|1 ||style="color: green;"|2 ||style="color: blue;"|½ ||style="color: green"|2 ||style="color: blue;"|1½ ||style="color: blue"|1 ||style="color: blue;"|1½ ||style="color: red;"|3 || -  || style="color: red;" |2½ ||style="color: green;"|2 ||
! 
|2 ||9 ||3 ||align=center|21
|-
! 30
| align=left|
|style="color: red;"|2½ ||style="color: blue;"|1 ||style="color: blue"|0 ||style="color: blue;"|1½ ||style="color: blue;"|1 ||style="color: green;"|2 ||style="color: green;"|2 ||style="color: blue;"|1½ ||style="color: blue;"|1½ ||style="color: blue;"|0 ||style="color: green;"|2 ||style="color: blue"|1½ ||style="color: blue;"|1½ || -  || style="color: red;" |2½ || 1
! 
|2 ||9 ||3 ||align=center|20½
|-
! 31
| align=left|
|style="color: blue;"|1½ ||style="color: green"|2 ||style="color: blue;"|1½ ||style="color: blue"|½ ||style="color: blue;"|1 ||style="color: blue;"|1½ ||style="color: blue;"|1 ||style="color: blue;"|0 ||style="color: blue"|1 ||style="color: red;"|2½ ||style="color: blue;"|0 ||style="color: red;"|3 ||style="color: green;"|2 ||style="color: blue;"|1½ || -  ||
! 
|2 ||10 ||2 ||align=center|19
|-
! -
| align=left|
| 1½ || 0 || 2½ || || 3 || 1½ || 1 || ½ || 1½ || 2 || 2½ || || || 3 || || -
! 
| - || - || - || -
|}

 Team Albania refused to play Israel and withdrew after round 11. Their scores were set as friendlies.

Final C 
{| class="wikitable"
|-
! Place
! Country
! 32 !!33 !!34 !!35 !!36 !!37 !!38 !!39 !!40 !!41 !!42 !!43 !!44 !!45 !!46 !!47
! !!+ !!- !!= !!Points
|- 
! 32
| align=left|
| -  || style="color: red;" |3 ||style="color: green;"|2 ||style="color: red;"|3 ||style="color: green;"|2 ||style="color: red;"|3½ ||style="color: red;"|3½ ||style="color: red;"|3 ||style="color: red;"|3 ||style="color: red;"|4 ||style="color: red;"|3 ||style="color: red;"|2½ ||style="color: red;"|3 ||style="color: red;"|3 ||style="color: red;"|2½ ||style="color: red;"|4
! 
|13 ||0 ||2 ||align=center|45
|-
! 33
| align=left|
|style="color: blue"|1 || -  || style="color: red" |3 ||style="color: green"|2 ||style="color: green"|2 ||style="color: red"|3½ ||style="color: red"|2½ ||style="color: red"|3 ||style="color: green"|2 ||style="color: red"|3½ ||style="color: red"|2½ ||style="color: red"|3½ ||style="color: red"|2½ ||style="color: red"|3 ||style="color: red"|4 ||style="color: red;"|4
! 
|11 ||1 ||3 ||align=center|42
|-
! 34
| align=left|
|style="color: green"|2 ||style="color: blue"|1 || -  || style="color: green" |2 ||style="color: red"|2½ ||style="color: red"|2½ ||style="color: red"|2½ ||style="color: blue"|1½ ||style="color: red"|3 ||style="color: red"|2½ ||style="color: green"|2 ||style="color: red"|2½ ||style="color: red"|3½ ||style="color: red"|3½ ||style="color: red"|4 ||style="color: red;"|4
! 
|10 ||2 ||3 ||align=center|39
|-
! 35
| align=left|
|style="color: blue;"|1 ||style="color: green"|2 ||style="color: green;"|2 || -  || style="color: red;" |3½ ||style="color: red"|3 ||style="color: blue;"|1 ||style="color: blue;"|1½ ||style="color: red"|2½ ||style="color: red;"|3 ||style="color: red;"|3 ||style="color: red"|3 ||style="color: red;"|3 ||style="color: red;"|3½ ||style="color: red"|3 ||style="color: red;"|2½
! 
|10 ||3 ||2 ||align=center|37½
|-
! 36
| align=left|
|style="color: green;"|2 ||style="color: green;"|2 ||style="color: blue;"|1½ ||style="color: blue;"|½ || -  || style="color: blue;" |1½ ||style="color: green;"|2 ||style="color: red;"|2½ ||style="color: red;"|3 ||style="color: red;"|2½ ||style="color: green;"|2 ||style="color: green;"|2 ||style="color: red;"|3½ ||style="color: red;"|3 ||style="color: red;"|4 ||style="color: red;"|3½
! 
|7 ||3 ||5 ||align=center|35½
|-
! 37
| align=left|
|style="color: blue;"|½ ||style="color: blue;"|½ ||style="color: blue;"|1½ ||style="color: blue"|1 ||style="color: red;"|2½ || -  || style="color: blue" |1½ ||style="color: red;"|3½ ||style="color: green;"|2 ||style="color: red;"|2½ ||style="color: green;"|2 ||style="color: red;"|2½  ||style="color: green;"|2 ||style="color: red;"|4 ||style="color: red;"|3 ||style="color: red;"|3½
! 
|7 ||5 ||3 ||align=center|32½
|-
! 38
| align=left|
|style="color: blue"|½ ||style="color: blue;"|1½ ||style="color: blue;"|1½ ||style="color: red;"|3 ||style="color: green;"|2 ||style="color: red"|2½ || -  || style="color: blue;" |1½  ||style="color: red;"|3½ ||style="color: red;"|4 ||style="color: blue;"|1 ||style="color: green;"|2 ||style="color: blue;"|1½ ||style="color: green;"|2 ||style="color: green;"|2 ||style="color: red;"|2½
! 
|5 ||6 ||4 ||align=center|31
|-
! 39
| align=left|
|style="color: blue;"|1 ||style="color: blue;"|1 ||style="color: red;"|2½ ||style="color: red;"|2½ ||style="color: blue;"|1½ ||style="color: blue;"|½ ||style="color: red;"|2½ || -  || style="color: red" |2½ ||style="color: blue;"|1 ||style="color: green;"|2 ||style="color: green;"|2 ||style="color: green"|2 ||style="color: blue;"|1½ ||style="color: red;"|3½ ||style="color: red;"|2½
! 
|6 ||6 ||3 ||align=center|28½
|-
! 40
| align=left|
|style="color: blue;"|1 ||style="color: green;"|2 ||style="color: blue;"|1 ||style="color: blue"|1½ ||style="color: blue;"|1 ||style="color: green;"|2 ||style="color: blue;"|½ ||style="color: blue"|1½ || -  || style="color: red;" |2½ ||style="color: red;"|4 ||style="color: red;"|2½ ||style="color: green;"|2 ||style="color: red;"|3½ ||style="color: green"|2 ||style="color: blue;"|1½
! 
|4 ||7 ||4 ||align=center|28½
|-
! 41
| align=left|
|style="color: blue;"|0 ||style="color: blue"|½ ||style="color: blue"|1½ ||style="color: blue;"|1 ||style="color: blue;"|1½ ||style="color: blue;"|1½ ||style="color: blue;"|0 ||style="color: red;"|3 ||style="color: blue;"|1½ || -  || style="color: red;" |3 ||style="color: red;"|3 ||style="color: green"|2 ||style="color: red;"|3 ||style="color: green;"|2 ||style="color: red;"|3
! 
|5 ||8 ||2 ||align=center|26½
|-
! 42
| align=left|
|style="color: blue;"|1 ||style="color: blue;"|1½ ||style="color: green;"|2 ||style="color: blue;"|1 ||style="color: green;"|2 ||style="color: green;"|2 ||style="color: red;"|3 ||style="color: green;"|2 ||style="color: blue;"|0 ||style="color: blue;"|1 || -  || style="color: green;" |2 ||style="color: blue;"|1½ ||style="color: green;"|2 ||style="color: red;"|2½ ||style="color: red;"|3
! 
|3 ||6 ||6 ||align=center|26½
|-
! 43
| align=left|
|style="color: blue;"|1½ ||style="color: blue;"|½ ||style="color: blue;"|1½ ||style="color: blue"|1 ||style="color: green;"|2 ||style="color: blue;"|1½ ||style="color: green;"|2 ||style="color: green;"|2 ||style="color: blue;"|1½ ||style="color: blue;"|1 ||style="color: green;"|2 || -  || style="color: green;" |2 ||style="color: red"|2½ ||style="color: green;"|2 ||style="color: red;"|3½
! 
|2 ||7 ||6 ||align=center|26½
|-
! 44
| align=left|
|style="color: blue;"|1 ||style="color: blue;"|1½ ||style="color: blue;"|½ ||style="color: blue;"|1 ||style="color: blue;"|½ ||style="color: green;"|2 ||style="color: red;"|2½ ||style="color: green"|2 ||style="color: green;"|2 ||style="color: green"|2 ||style="color: red;"|2½ ||style="color: green;"|2 || -  || style="color: blue;" |1 ||style="color: green;"|2 ||style="color: red;"|2½
! 
|3 ||6 ||6 ||align=center|25
|-
! 45
| align=left|
|style="color: blue;"|1 ||style="color: blue;"|1 ||style="color: blue"|½ ||style="color: blue;"|½ ||style="color: blue;"|1 ||style="color: blue;"|0 ||style="color: green;"|2 ||style="color: red;"|2½ ||style="color: blue;"|½ ||style="color: blue;"|1 ||style="color: green;"|2 ||style="color: blue"|1½ ||style="color: red;"|3 || -  || style="color: red;" |2½ ||style="color: red;"|2½
! 
|4 ||9 ||2 ||align=center|21½
|-
! 46
| align=left|
|style="color: blue;"|1½ ||style="color: blue"|0 ||style="color: blue;"|0 ||style="color: blue"|1 ||style="color: blue;"|0 ||style="color: blue;"|1 ||style="color: green;"|2 ||style="color: blue;"|½ ||style="color: green"|2 ||style="color: green;"|2 ||style="color: blue;"|1½ ||style="color: green;"|2 ||style="color: green;"|2 ||style="color: blue;"|1½ || -  ||style="color: green;"|2
! 
|0 ||9 ||6 ||align=center|19
|-
! 47
| align=left|
|style="color: blue;"|0 ||style="color: blue"|0 ||style="color: blue;"|0 ||style="color: blue"|1½ ||style="color: blue;"|½ ||style="color: blue;"|½ ||style="color: blue;"|1½ ||style="color: blue;"|1½ ||style="color: red"|2½ ||style="color: blue;"|1 ||style="color: blue;"|1 ||style="color: blue;"|½ ||style="color: blue;"|1½ ||style="color: blue;"|1½ ||style="color: green;"|2 || -
! 
|1 ||13 ||1 ||align=center|15½
|}

Final D 
{| class="wikitable"
|-
! Place
! Country
! 48 !!49 !!50 !!51 !!52 !!53 !!54 !!55 !!56 !!57 !!58 !!59 !!60 !!61 !!62
! !!+ !!- !!= !!Points
|- 
! 48
| align=left|
| -  || style="color: green;" |2 ||style="color: red;"|3 ||style="color: red;"|4 ||style="color: red;"|3 ||style="color: red;"|4 ||style="color: blue;"|1½ ||style="color: red;"|2½ ||style="color: red;"|3½ ||style="color: red;"|3 ||style="color: red;"|4 ||style="color: red;"|4 ||style="color: red;"|4 ||style="color: red;"|4 ||style="color: red;"|4
! 
|12 ||1 ||1 ||align=center|46½
|-
! 49
| align=left|
|style="color: green"|2 || -  || style="color: red" |3½ ||style="color: red"|3 ||style="color: red"|3½ ||style="color: red"|3 ||style="color: red"|2½ ||style="color: red"|3½ ||style="color: red"|2½ ||style="color: red"|3 ||style="color: red"|3½ ||style="color: red"|2½ ||style="color: red"|4 ||style="color: red"|3 ||style="color: red"|3
! 
|13 ||0 ||1 ||align=center|42½
|-
! 50
| align=left|
|style="color: blue"|1 ||style="color: blue"|½ || -  || style="color: red" |2½ ||style="color: red"|3 ||style="color: blue"|1 ||style="color: red"|3½ ||style="color: red"|2½ ||style="color: green"|2 ||style="color: red"|2½ ||style="color: red"|2½ ||style="color: green"|2 ||style="color: red"|3½ ||style="color: red"|3 ||style="color: red"|2½
! 
|9 ||3 ||2 ||align=center|32
|-
! 51
| align=left|
|style="color: blue;"|0 ||style="color: blue"|1 ||style="color: blue;"|1½ || -  || style="color: blue;" |1½ ||style="color: red"|2½ ||style="color: red;"|3½ ||style="color: blue;"|1½ ||style="color: green"|2 ||style="color: red;"|2½ ||style="color: red;"|3 ||style="color: red"|3 ||style="color: red;"|3½ ||style="color: red;"|2½ ||style="color: red"|2½
! 
|8 ||5 ||1 ||align=center|30½
|-
! 52
| align=left|
|style="color: blue;"|1 ||style="color: blue;"|½ ||style="color: blue;"|1 ||style="color: red;"|2½ || -  || style="color: green;" |2 ||style="color: red;"|2½ ||style="color: red;"|2½ ||style="color: green;"|2 ||style="color: green;"|2 ||style="color: green;"|2 ||style="color: red;"|3 ||style="color: red;"|2½ ||style="color: red;"|3 ||style="color: red;"|3½
! 
|7 ||3 ||4 ||align=center|30
|-
! 53
| align=left|
|style="color: blue;"|0 ||style="color: blue;"|1 ||style="color: red;"|3 ||style="color: blue"|1½ ||style="color: green;"|2 || -  || style="color: green" |2 ||style="color: red;"|3 ||style="color: red;"|2½ ||style="color: red;"|3½ ||style="color: green;"|2 ||style="color: red;"|3  ||style="color: blue;"|½ ||style="color: red;"|2½ ||style="color: red;"|3
! 
|7 ||4 ||3 ||align=center|29½
|-
! 54
| align=left|
|style="color: red"|2½ ||style="color: blue;"|1½ ||style="color: blue;"|½ ||style="color: blue;"|½ ||style="color: blue;"|1½ ||style="color: green"|2 || -  || style="color: blue;" |1½ ||style="color: red;"|3½ ||style="color: red;"|2½ ||style="color: red;"|2½ ||style="color: red;"|2½ ||style="color: green;"|2 ||style="color: red;"|2½ ||style="color: red;"|3½
! 
|7 ||5 ||2 ||align=center|29
|-
! 55
| align=left|
|style="color: blue;"|1½ ||style="color: blue;"|½ ||style="color: blue;"|1½ ||style="color: red;"|2½ ||style="color: blue;"|1½ ||style="color: blue;"|1 ||style="color: red;"|2½ || -  || style="color: green" |2 ||style="color: blue;"|1 ||style="color: blue;"|1½ ||style="color: red;"|2½ ||style="color: red"|3½ ||style="color: red;"|3½ ||style="color: red;"|3
! 
|6 ||7 ||1 ||align=center|28
|-
! 56
| align=left|
|style="color: blue;"|½ ||style="color: blue;"|1½ ||style="color: green;"|2 ||style="color: green"|2 ||style="color: green;"|2 ||style="color: blue;"|1½ ||style="color: blue;"|½ ||style="color: red"|2½ || -  || style="color: red;" |2½ ||style="color: green;"|2 ||style="color: red;"|2½ ||style="color: red;"|3 ||style="color: red;"|2½ ||style="color: red"|3
! 
|5 ||4 ||5 ||align=center|27½
|-
! 57
| align=left|
|style="color: blue;"|1 ||style="color: blue"|1 ||style="color: blue"|1½ ||style="color: blue;"|1½ ||style="color: green;"|2 ||style="color: blue;"|½ ||style="color: blue;"|1½ ||style="color: red;"|3 ||style="color: blue;"|1½ || -  || style="color: red;" |2½ ||style="color: red;"|2½ ||style="color: blue"|1½ ||style="color: green;"|2 ||style="color: red;"|4
! 
|4 ||8 ||2 ||align=center|26
|-
! 58
| align=left|
|style="color: blue;"|0 ||style="color: blue;"|½ ||style="color: blue;"|1½ ||style="color: blue;"|1 ||style="color: green;"|2 ||style="color: green;"|2 ||style="color: blue;"|1½ ||style="color: red;"|2½ ||style="color: green;"|2 ||style="color: blue;"|1½ || -  || style="color: red;" |2½ ||style="color: blue;"|1 ||style="color: red;"|2½ ||style="color: red;"|3½
! 
|4 ||7 ||3 ||align=center|24
|-
! 59
| align=left|
|style="color: blue;"|0 ||style="color: blue;"|1½ ||style="color: green;"|2 ||style="color: blue"|1 ||style="color: blue;"|1 ||style="color: blue;"|1 ||style="color: blue;"|1½ ||style="color: blue;"|1½ ||style="color: blue;"|1½ ||style="color: blue;"|1½ ||style="color: blue;"|1½ || -  || style="color: red;" |2½ ||style="color: red"|2½ ||style="color: red;"|4
! 
|3 ||10 ||1 ||align=center|23
|-
! 60
| align=left|
|style="color: blue;"|0 ||style="color: blue;"|0 ||style="color: blue;"|½ ||style="color: blue;"|½ ||style="color: blue;"|1½ ||style="color: red;"|3½ ||style="color: green;"|2 ||style="color: blue"|½ ||style="color: blue;"|1 ||style="color: red"|2½ ||style="color: red;"|3 ||style="color: blue;"|1½ || -  || style="color: blue;" |1½ ||style="color: red;"|2½
! 
|4 ||9 ||1 ||align=center|20½
|-
! 61
| align=left|
|style="color: blue;"|0 ||style="color: blue;"|1 ||style="color: blue"|1 ||style="color: blue;"|1½ ||style="color: blue;"|1 ||style="color: blue;"|1½ ||style="color: blue;"|1½ ||style="color: blue;"|½ ||style="color: blue;"|1½ ||style="color: green;"|2 ||style="color: blue;"|1½ ||style="color: blue"|1½ ||style="color: red;"|2½ || -  || style="color: red;" |3½
! 
|2 ||11 ||1 ||align=center|20½
|-
! 62
| align=left|
|style="color: blue;"|0 ||style="color: blue"|1 ||style="color: blue;"|1½ ||style="color: blue"|1½ ||style="color: blue;"|½ ||style="color: blue;"|1 ||style="color: blue;"|½ ||style="color: blue;"|1 ||style="color: blue"|1 ||style="color: blue;"|0 ||style="color: blue;"|½ ||style="color: blue;"|0 ||style="color: blue;"|1½ ||style="color: blue;"|½ || - 
! 
|0 ||14 ||0 ||align=center|10½
|}

Individual medals
 Board 1:  Robert Hübner 15 / 18 = 83.3%
 Board 2:  Viktor Korchnoi 11 / 15 = 73.3%
 Board 3:  Ljubomir Ljubojević 15½ / 19 = 81.6%
 Board 4:  Mikhail Tal 14 / 16 = 87.5%
 1st reserve:  Anatoly Karpov 13 / 15 = 86.7%
 2nd reserve:  Aldo Haïk 11 / 12 = 91.7%

Best game
The Best Game prize went to Werner Hug (Switzerland) - Vlastimil Hort (Czechoslovakia) from Final A.

Women's event

Twenty-three nations took part in the women's Olympiad. From four preliminary groups the teams were split into three finals. The Soviet Union won.

Preliminaries

 Group 1: 

 Group 2:

 Group 3:

 Group 4:

Finals

{| class="wikitable"
|+ Final A
! # !! Country !! Players !! Averagerating !! Points !! MP
|-
| style="background:gold;"|1 ||  || Nona Gaprindashvili, Alla Kushnir, Irina Levitina || 2373 || 11½ || 
|-
| style="background:silver;"|2 ||  Romania  ||Elisabeta Polihroniade, Gertrude Baumstark, Alexandra Nicolau || 2258|| 8 || 8
|-
| style="background:#cc9966;"|3 ||  || Mária Ivánka, Zsuzsa Verőci, Gyuláné Krizsán-Bilek || 2233 ||8 || 8
|-
| 4 ||  || Tatjana Lematschko, Antonina Georgieva, Vesmina Shikova || 2130|| 7½ || 
|-
| 5 ||  || Stepanka Vokřálová, Květa Eretová, Eva Hojdarová  || 2168|| 7 || 
|-
| 6 ||  || Anni Laakmann, Irmgard Kärner, Ursula Wasnetsky  || 1885 || 5½ || 
|-
| 7 ||  || Waltraud Nowarra, Gabriele Just, Christina Hölzlein  || 2148 || 4½ || 
|-
| 8 ||  || Jana Hartston, Elaine Pritchard, Anne Sunnucks  || 2005 || 4 || 
|}

{| class="wikitable"
|+ Final B
! # !! Country !! Players !! Averagerating !! Points !! MP
|-
| 9 ||  Poland || Krystyna Radzikowska, Hanna Ereńska-Radzewska, Mirosława Litmanowicz || 2138|| 10½ || 
|-
| 10 ||  || Milunka Lazarević, Katarina Jovanović, Henrijeta Konarkowska-Sokolov  || 2273 || 8½  || 
|-
| 11 ||  || Ingeborg Kattinger, Alfreda Hausner, Wilma Samt  || 1800 || 7 || 7
|-
| 12 ||  || Hendrika Timmer, Ingrid Jansen, Ada van der Giessen  || 2035|| 7 || 7
|-
| 13 ||  || Solveig Haraldsson, Ingrid Keményová-Svensson, Ulla Bohmgren  || 1848|| 6½ || 
|-
| 14 ||  || Ruth Cardoso, Regina Fontanelli, Ivone Moysés  || 1905 || 6 || 
|-
| 15 ||  || Ganginchugin Hulgana, Sandagdorj Handsuren, Biamba  || 1800 || 5½ || 
|-
| 16 ||  || Narelle Kellner, Marion McGrath, Lynda Maddern  || 1800 || 5 || 
|}

{| class="wikitable"
|+ Final C
! # !! Country !! Players !!  Points !! MP
|-
| 17 ||  || Anna Näpfer, Elsa Lüssy, Fässler J.  ||  9|| 
|-
| 18 ||  || Frida Rabinovich, Lidia Gal, Klugas S.  ||  8½|| 
|-
| 19 ||  || Mok Poh Pheng, Giam Yoke Chin, Jane Tan  ||  6 || 
|-
| 20 ||  || Dorren O'Siochrú, Aileen Noonan, O'Clery A.  || 5½ || 5
|-
| 21 ||  || Sirkka-Liisa Vuorenpää, Johanna Tuomainen, Marjatta Palasto  ||  5½ || 4
|-
| 22 ||  || Nancy Elder, Mary McGinn, Miriam Little  || 4½ || 
|-
| 23 ||  || Miyoko Watai, Otani K., Kyoto Watanabe  ||  3 || 
|}

Final A

Final B

Final C

Individual medals
 Board 1:  Nona Gaprindashvili  6½ / 8 = 81.3%
 Board 2:  Alla Kushnir 7 / 8 = 87.5%
 Reserve:  Henrijeta Konarkowska-Sokolov 6½ / 9 = 72.2%

References

External links
 20th Chess Olympiad: Skopje 1972 OlimpBase
 5th Women's Chess Olympiad: Skopje 1972 Olimpbase

1970s in Skopje
Olympiad 20
1972 in the Socialist Republic of Macedonia
Chess Olympiad 20
Olympiad 20
20
Chess Olympiad
Chess Olympiad
Chess Olympiad 20